Chess at the 2019 Southeast Asian Games was the first SEA Games tournament since the 2013 edition in Naypyidaw. Chess will feature seven team events. Among these events are men's and women's blitz, rapid and standard while other categories such as bullet, lightning, armageddon and the Asian chess are also under consideration for inclusion. The National Chess Federation of the Philippines originally planned to host individual events but scrapped such plans. Chess is being held from 1 to 8 December 2019.

Three demonstration events were also held in chess.

Medal summary

Medal table

Medalists

Demonstration events

References

External links
 

2019
Southeast Asian Games 2019
2019 Southeast Asian Games events
Southeast Asian Games